Concrete and Constructional Engineering was a magazine published in London, England, by Concrete Publications from 1906 to 1966. The magazine chronicled in its pages the increasing popularity of reinforced concrete as a construction material in the early and mid twentieth century.

History

The magazine was founded in 1906 by architect and founder of the Concrete Institute (later The Institution of Structural Engineers), Edwin Sachs. It was described by the publishers as "A bi-monthly journal for engineers, architects and surveyors, contractors and builders, and all workers in cement, concrete, reinforced concrete, and constructional steel." It became monthly in 1910.

The magazine chronicled in its pages the increasing popularity of reinforced concrete as a construction material in the early and mid twentieth century. An editorial in the January 1910 edition noted that the material was increasing acceptable to the British government but that some "ultra-conservative members of the technical professions" had been slow to place their confidence in the material. In addition, the journal complained that "architects of high-standing" were not recommending the material due to prejudices about the appearance of the material in buildings.

Construction
In successes, the journal reported the construction of an all concrete (apart from the roof) football stadium for Bradford City Football Club at their Midland Road (Valley Parade), stadium in 1908, which was required following the promotion of the team to Division One. The architect was Archibald Leitch.

The magazine merged with Structural Concrete to form Concrete (London) and ceased publication in 1966.

References

External links
Official Website (Archived)
Polished Concrete Specialist
Silestone vs Quartz: What is the difference?

Concrete
Construction
Engineering magazines
Magazines established in 1906
Magazines disestablished in 1966
Defunct magazines published in the United Kingdom
Magazines published in London
Business magazines published in the United Kingdom
Architecture magazines
1906 establishments in England